The 1982–83 Utah Utes men's basketball team represented the University of Utah as a member of the Western Athletic Conference during the 1982-83 season. Head coach Jerry Pimm would lead the Utes to a Western Athletic Conference championship and the Sweet Sixteen of the NCAA tournament.

Roster

Schedule and results

|-
!colspan=9 style=| Regular season

|-
!colspan=9 style=| NCAA Tournament

Awards and honors
Pace Mannion – co-WAC Player of the Year

NBA Draft

References

Utah Utes men's basketball seasons
Utah
Utah
Utah Utes
Utah Utes